Rutesheim is a town located in the district of Böblingen, Baden-Württemberg, Germany.

Location
Rutesheim is situated directly to the Highway 8 (Bundesautobahn 8),  from the town Leonberg,  from the city Stuttgart and just  from Stuttgart Airport and from the new exhibition center,  way west from the town Heimsheim.

History
Rutesheim was first mentioned in the year 767 in a deed from the convent of Lorsch.

The council of ministers decided on 22 January 2008, to award Rutesheim the designation town on 1 July 2008. Prime Minister Oettinger assigned the deed to the town in a ceremonial act on 26 June 2008.

Population development
The sources are census results (¹) or the data of the statistical office Baden-Württemberg.

Politics

Mayor 
Since 2018 Susanne Dornes (née Widmaier) has been the mayor of the city.

City council 
The current legislative period lasts until 2014. Distribution of seats after the election of June 2009:

Partnerships 
Scheibbs (Niederösterreich), since 1972
Saalburg-Ebersdorf (Thüringen), since 1989
Perosa Argentina (Italien), friendship treaty since October 2008

Religions
There are three Evangelical churches, two New-Apostolic churches, one Evangelical Methodist church and one Roman Catholic church in Rutesheim.

The town has a history with the Waldensians (Perouse).

Sport
The most well-known sports club from Rutesheim is SKV Rutesheim. Its first football team is playing in the seven-rated Landesliga Württemberg.

References

Böblingen (district)
Württemberg